The Minsk Cup is a one-day cycling race held annually in Minsk, Belarus. It is part of UCI Europe Tour in category 1.2.

Winners

References

UCI Europe Tour races
Cycle races in Belarus
2015 establishments in Belarus
Recurring sporting events established in 2015